David Copperfield is a novel by Charles Dickens.

David Copperfield may also refer to:
David Copperfield (character), the title character of the novel
David Copperfield (illusionist) (born 1956), American illusionist and stage magician
David Copperfield (comedian) (born 1947), British comedian and musician
PC David Copperfield, British police officer and author

Film 
David Copperfield (1911 film), a film by Theodore Marston
David Copperfield (1913 film), a film by Thomas Bentley
David Copperfield (1922 film), a film by A. W. Sandberg
David Copperfield (1935 film), a film by George Cukor
David Copperfield (1956 TV serial), a TV serial starring Robert Hardy
David Copperfield (1966 TV serial), a TV serial starring Ian McKellen
David Copperfield (1969 film), a film by Delbert Mann
David Copperfield (1974 TV serial), a BBC TV serial that has aired on PBS
David Copperfield (1986 TV serial), a BBC TV serial with Simon Callow
David Copperfield (1993 film), an animated made-for-television film
David Copperfield (1999 film), a TV film by Simon Curtis
David Copperfield (2000 film), a 2000 made-for-television film by Peter Medak
The Personal History of David Copperfield, a 2019 film chronicling the life of the novel's character

Copperfield, David